The South African Railways Class 7E2, Series 1 is an electric locomotive. South African Railways placed 25 Class 7E2, Series 1 electric locomotives with a Co-Co wheel arrangement in service in 1982.

Manufacturer

The 25 kV AC Class 7E2, Series 1 electric locomotive was designed for the South African Railways by the 50 c/s Group, consisting of ACEC of Belgium, AEG-Telefunken and Siemens of Germany, Alsthom-Atlantique and Société MTE of France, and Brown, Boveri & Cie of Switzerland. The locomotives were built by Union Carriage & Wagon (UCW) in Nigel, Transvaal, which was the sub-contractor for mechanical components and assembly and delivered in 1982, numbered E7151 to E7175. UCW did not allocate builder's numbers to the locomotives it built for the SAR, but used the SAR unit numbers for their record keeping.

Orientation
These dual cab locomotives have a roof access ladder on one side only, just to the right of the cab access door. The roof access ladder end is marked as the no. 2 end.

In visual appearance, the Class 7E2, Series 1 can be distinguished from the Series 2 by the absence of the vertical grilles on both sides just to the rear of the driver's window on Series 2 locomotives. Both series have a large grille to the right of centre on the side opposite the roof access ladder side, near roof level on Series 1 locomotives and low down near sill level on Series 2. The three grilles in line just to the rear of the side doors on Series 1 locomotives were replaced with a single long grille on Series 2 locomotives. Like the Class 7E, some of the Class 7E2, Series 1 locomotives have distinctive "eyebrow" rainwater beadings above their cab windscreens, but these were added post-delivery and were not installed on all the units.

Characteristics

Brakes
The control of traction and rheostatic braking on the Class 7E2, Series 1 is by stepless solid-state electronics. The electrical equipment was designed for high power factor operation, obtained by a sector control method. Like the earlier South African Class 7E, these locomotives are equipped with thyristor technology from the 50 c/s Group.

Bogies

Like the Class 7E, the Class 7E2 was built with sophisticated traction linkages on the bogies. Together with the locomotive's electronic wheel-slip detection system, these traction struts, mounted between the linkages on the bogies and the locomotive body and colloquially referred to as grasshopper legs, ensure the maximum transfer of power to the rails without causing wheel-slip by reducing the adhesion of the leading bogie and increasing that of the trailing bogie by as much as 15% upon starting off.

Pantographs
As on the Class 7E, the locomotive's pantograph contact shoe centres are directly above the bogie pivot centres to reduce the possibility of pantograph hookups on catenary in sharp curves, such as in turnouts, as a result of sideways movement of the pantograph in relation to the overhead wire.

Service
The Class 7E2, Series 1 was placed in service on the northern 25 kV routes from Pyramid South north of Pretoria via Warmbad to Pietersburg and via Brits and Rustenburg to Thabazimbi. In 2012, as more of the new Class 19E locomotives became available, some were transferred to the Eastern Cape where they augmented the existing Class 7E fleet working out of Port Elizabeth via De Aar to Kimberley and Beaufort West.

Liveries
All the Class 7E2, Series 1 locomotives were delivered in the SAR red oxide livery with signal red buffer beams and cowcatchers, yellow whiskers and with the number plates on the sides mounted on three-stripe yellow wings. In the 1990s some of them were repainted in the Spoornet orange livery with a yellow and blue chevron pattern on the buffer beams and cowcatchers. Some later received the Spoornet maroon livery. In the late 1990s most were repainted in the Spoornet blue livery with either solid or outline numbers on the long hood sides. After 2008 in the Transnet Freight Rail (TFR) era, some were repainted in the TFR red, green and yellow livery.

References

External links

Cape gauge railway locomotives
Co-Co locomotives
Electric locomotives of South Africa
Railway locomotives introduced in 1982
Union Carriage & Wagon locomotives
50 c/s Group locomotives